Rhinella ceratophrys, formerly Bufo ceratophrys, is a species of toad in the family Bufonidae. It is sometimes known as the horned toad in English and sapo cornudo in Spanish. It has a wide distribution in the upper Amazon. Its natural habitats are in old and second-growth lowland tropical rainforests. It is threatened by habitat loss from deforestation.

References

ceratophrys
Amphibians of Brazil
Amphibians of Colombia
Amphibians of Ecuador
Amphibians of Peru
Amphibians of Venezuela
Taxonomy articles created by Polbot
Amphibians described in 1882
Taxobox binomials not recognized by IUCN